Seimeni (plural of Seimen) designates the group of flintlock-armed infantry mercenaries charged with guarding the hospodar (ruler) and his court in 17th and 18th century Wallachia and Moldavia. They were mostly of Serb and other Balkan origin. The term is of Turkish origin: seğmen means "young armed man". In modern transcriptions of Slavonic, it may also appear as simén (plural: siméni)  or siimén (siiméni).
	
Menaced by the growing privileges of boyars and threatened to lose land grants or be turned into serfs, the Wallachian seimeni rebelled in 1655, being crushed after Prince Constantin Şerban enlisted the help of George II Rákóczi, Prince of Transylvania, as well as that of Moldavia's Voivode Gheorghe Ştefan. After exercising a rule of terror in Bucharest, capturing and executing several boyars, they were decisively defeated by Rákóczi on June 26, 1655, in a battle on the Teleajen River.

See also
Serbs in Romania

References

Literature 
Gheorghe I. Brătianu, Sfatul domnesc și Adunarea Stărilor in Principatele Române, Bucharest, 1995
Constantin C. Giurescu, Istoria Bucureștilor. Din cele mai vechi timpuri pînă în zilele noastre, Bucharest, 1966, p. 73

Social history of Romania
Infantry units and formations
Mercenary units and formations
Romanian words and phrases
Turkish words and phrases
History of Wallachia (1512–1714)
History of the Serbs
Serbian mercenaries
Military history of Romania
Serbs from the Ottoman Empire